During the 2011–12 season AFC Ajax participated in the Eredivisie, the KNVB Cup, the UEFA Champions League and the UEFA Europa League. The first training took place on 27 June 2011. The traditional AFC Ajax Open Day will be held on 3 August 2011, followed by a testimonial match for the retired former Ajax goalkeeper Edwin van der Sar.

Ajax's U19 squad will play in the inaugural tournament of the NextGen series.

Pre-season
The first training for the 2011–12 season was held on 27 June 2011. In preparation for the new season Ajax organized a trainingsstage in Fürth, Germany. The squad from manager Frank de Boer stayed there from 11 July 2011 to 16 July 2011. During this training stage, friendly matches were played against Jahn Regensburg and 1. FC Nürnberg. Further friendly matches were played against VV Buitenpost, AZSV Aalten, FC Emmen, Brøndby and Independiente.

Player statistics 
Appearances for competitive matches only

|-
|colspan="14"|Players sold or loaned out after the start of the season:

|}
Updated 22 January 2012

2011–12 Selection by Nationality

Team statistics

Eredivisie standings 2011–12

Points by match day

Total points by match day

Standing by match day

Goals by match day

Statistics for the 2011–12 season
This is an overview of all the statistics for played matches in the 2011–12 season.

2011–12 team records

Topscorers

Placements

 Jan Vertonghen is voted Player of the year by the supporters of AFC Ajax.
 Ricardo van Rhijn is voted Talent of the year by the supporters of AFC Ajax.
 Frank de Boer is nominated for the Rinus Michels Award 2012 in the category: Best Trainer/Coach in Professional Football.
 Christian Eriksen is voted Danish Football Player of the Year by the Danish Football Association and TV2. 
 Nicolai Boilesen is voted Danish Football Talent of the Year by the Danish Football Association and TV2. 
 Dmitri Bulykin is voted Best Russian Football Player Abroad by the Russian Football Union. 
 Theo Janssen is voted Gelders Sportsman of the Year by the Gelders Sportgala 2011. 
 Jan Vertonghen wins the Golden boots award.
 Christian Eriksen wins the Bronze boots award.

Pre-season and friendlies

Competitions
All times are in CEST

Johan Cruyff Shield

Eredivisie

KNVB Cup

UEFA Champions League

Group stage

Tiebreakers
Lyon and Ajax are tied on their head-to-head records as shown below, so Lyon are ranked ahead of Ajax because of their higher overall goal difference in the group.

UEFA Europa League

Knockout phase

Round of 32

Transfers for 2011–12

Summer transfer window
For a list of all Dutch football transfers in the summer window (1 July 2011 to 31 August 2011) please see List of Dutch football transfers summer 2011.

Arrivals 
 The following players moved to AFC Ajax.

Departures 
 The following players moved from AFC Ajax.

Winter transfer window 
For a list of all Dutch football transfers in the winter window (1 January 2012 to 1 February 2012) please see List of Dutch football transfers winter 2011–12.

Arrivals 
 The following players moved to AFC Ajax.

Departures 
 The following players moved from AFC Ajax.

External links 
Ajax Amsterdam Official Website in Nederlandse
UEFA Website

Ajax
AFC Ajax seasons
Ajax
Ajax
Dutch football championship-winning seasons